Stenopsestis is a genus of moths belonging to the subfamily Thyatirinae of the Drepanidae. It was described by Yoshimoto in 1983.

Species
 Stenopsestis alternata (Moore, 1881)
 Stenopsestis bruna Jiang, Yang, Xue & Han, 2015

References

 , 1983, Tyô to Ga 34: 27.
 , 2001, Acta Zoologica Academiae Scientiarum Hungaricae 47 (1): 27-85
 

Thyatirinae
Drepanidae genera